Din Joe is an Irish nickname. Notable people with the nickname include:

 Din Joe Buckley (1919–2009), Irish hurler
 Din Joe Crowley (1945–2016), Irish Gaelic footballer

See also
 
 
 Din (name)
 Joe (given name)